A gravel road is a type of unpaved road surfaced with gravel that has been brought to the site from a quarry or stream bed. They are common in less-developed nations, and also in the rural areas of developed nations such as Canada and the United States. In New Zealand, and other Commonwealth countries, they may be known as metal roads. They may be referred to as "dirt roads" in common speech, but that term is used more for unimproved roads with no surface material added. If well constructed and maintained, a gravel road is an all-weather road.

Characteristics

Construction

Compared to sealed roads, which require large machinery to work and pour concrete or to lay and smooth a bitumen-based surface, gravel roads are easy and cheap to build. However, compared to dirt roads, all-weather gravel highways are quite expensive to build, as they require front loaders, dump trucks, graders, and roadrollers to provide a base course of compacted earth or other material, sometimes macadamised, covered with one or more different layers of gravel. Graders are used to "blade" the road's surface (pass frequently to mix and distribute the gravel) to produce a more extreme camber compared to a paved road to aid drainage, to produce an "A" shaped surface to the road called a "crown", as well as to construct drainage ditches and embankments in low-lying areas. Cellular confinement systems can be used to prevent the washboarding effect.

Construction of a gravel road begins with the base or subgrade layer. The expected road traffic volume and the average daily truck passage must be considered during the design process as they will influence the thickness of this layer, along with the balances of gravel and fines. Geotextile fabric may be laid to improve the stability of the subgrade layer. When geotextile fabric is used, a gravel layer with a minimum thickness of 6" (15 cm) is suggested to ensure the fabric remains unexposed. Road construction guidelines suggest that the crown in the road surface begins at the center point in the road, and does not exceed a 4% gradation from the center to the edge of the roadway.

The surface layer is constructed atop the subgrade layer. The amount of precipitation is taken into consideration for the selection of gravel size distribution. The surface layer will follow the crown established by the subgrade layer. Scarification of the subgrade layer prior to application of the surface gravel layer can be performed to increase the mixing and adherence between layers. Construction of the road surface is done gradually through multiple applications of layers of gravel, with compaction prior to the addition of the following layer. During reparation of a damaged road, ensuring that any washboarding, rutting, potholes, and erosion is adequately removed will minimize future need for reparation. Windrowing can be performed along the edges of roads in dry climates to allow easy access to gravel material for small repairs.

Materials
The gravel used consists of varying amount of crushed stone, sand, and fines. Crushed stone, also called road metal, is used because gravel with fractured faces will stay in place better than rounded river pebbles. A good gravel for a gravel road will have a higher percentage of fines than gravel used as a subbase for a paved road. This often causes problems if a gravel road is paved without adding sand and gravel sized stone to dilute the percentage of fines.

A gravel road is quite different from a 'gravel drive', popular as private driveways in the United Kingdom. This uses clean gravel consisting of uniform, rounded stones and small pebbles.

Laterite and murram roads
In Africa and parts of Asia and South America, laterite soils are used to build dirt roads. However laterite, called murram in East Africa, varies considerably in the proportion of stones (which are usually very small) to earth and sand. It ranges from a hard gravel to a softer earth embedded with small stones. Not all laterite and murram roads are therefore strictly gravel roads. Laterite and murram which contains a significant proportion of clay becomes very slippery when wet, and in the rainy season, it may be difficult even for four-wheel drive vehicles to avoid slipping off very cambered roads into the drainage ditches at the side of the road. As it dries out, such laterite can become very hard, like sun-dried bricks.

Maintenance

Gravel roads require much more frequent maintenance than paved roads, especially after wet periods and when accommodating increased traffic. Wheel motion shoves material to the outside (as well as in-between travelled lanes), leading to rutting, reduced water-runoff, and eventual road destruction if unchecked. As long as the process is interrupted early enough, simple re-grading is sufficient, with material being pushed back into shape.

Segments of gravel roads on grades also rut easily as a result of flowing water. When grading or building the road, waterbars are used to direct water off the road. As an alternative method, humps can be formed in the gravel along the road to impede water flow, thereby reducing rutting.

Another problem with gravel roads is washboarding — the formation of corrugations across the surface at right angles to the direction of travel. Narrow-spaced washboarding can develop on gravel roads due to inconsistent moisture levels in the gravel, poor quality gravel, and vehicular stress to the road. Washboarding can also occur when graders exceed recommended speeds during the construction or maintenance phase causing the blade to bounce on the surface creating a pattern of widely-spaced corrugations. Corrugations from washboarding can become severe enough to cause vibration in vehicles so that bolts loosen or cracks form in components. Proper grading is needed to remove the corrugations, and reconstruction with careful choice of good quality gravel can help prevent them reforming. Additionally, installing a cellular confinement system will prevent the washboard-like corrugations from occurring.

Gravel roads are often found in cold climates because they are less vulnerable to freeze / thaw damage than asphalt roads. The inferior surface of gravel is not an issue if the road is covered by snow and ice for extended periods.

Dust control 
Dust control is routine practice on gravel roads in order to reduce the need for frequent maintenance, mitigate health concerns, and to prevent dust-related damage to roadside vegetation. Some common dust-suppression techniques are the application of a chloride solution (calcium chloride, magnesium chloride, sodium chloride), the application of a resin compound, or the incorporation of natural clay into the gravel mixture during the construction phase.

Calcium chloride as a dust suppressant 
Calcium chloride provides dust suppression through its hygroscopic properties, allowing moisture to be drawn in and retained by the compound. Calcium chloride can be applied in either dry (pellet or flake) or wet (dissolved pre-prepared solution) form. Successful applications can be effective for up to three years, depending on the weather and traffic conditions for the roadway.

Dry application of this type of dust suppressant is begun by first preparing the road surface through grader passes, moving the top 5–8 cm of gravel creating windrows on the edges of the road. Calcium chloride is then applied to the road surface, and the road is then sprayed with water until the compound is dissolved. A grader "blades" the surface in numerous passes to ensure a uniform distribution of the compound. Compaction and the forming of the road surface is then performed to finalize the process.

Wet application begins by spraying the road surface with a 30% concentration solution of calcium chloride. After the solution is applied, the top 5–8 cm of gravel is mixed through numerous passes of a grader. The road is then formed and compacted.

Driving

Although well-constructed and graded gravel roads are suitable for speeds of up to 100 km/h (60 mph), driving on them requires far more attention to variations of the surface, and it is easier to lose control than on a paved road. In addition to potholes, ruts and loose stony or sandy ridges at the edges or in the middle of the road, problems associated with driving on gravel roads include:

sharper and larger stones cutting and puncturing tires, or being thrown up by the wheels and damaging the underside, especially puncturing the fuel tank of unmodified cars
stones skipping up hitting the car body, lights or windshields when two vehicles pass at high speed
dust thrown up from a passing vehicle reducing visibility
'washboard' corrugations cause loss of control or damage to vehicles due to excessive vibration. These are most often found near intersections as stopping or braking causes them to form or otherwise if heavy farm or other equipment often uses these roads.
skidding on mud after rain
vehicle fishtailing as a result of ruts in the surface of the gravel. Often found on frequently traveled roads.
In higher rainfall areas, the increased camber required to drain water, and open drainage ditches at the sides of the road, often cause vehicles with a high centre of gravity, such as trucks and off-road vehicles, to overturn if they do not keep close to the crown of the road.
Excess dust permeates door-opening rubber moulding, breaking the seal.
Lost binder in the form of road dust, when mixed with rain, will wear away the painted surfaces of vehicles.
Many gravel roads are only one lane wide or slightly larger, thus requiring special attention when driving at higher speeds.

Related types

Resource road
According to the British Columbia Ministry of Forests, resource roads are typically "one- or two-lane gravel roads built for industrial purposes to access natural resources in remote areas". They may be used by industrial vehicles or the general public, and as a link to rural communities. Driving on resource roads can be hazardous for many reasons, including limited visibility, unusual road geometry, and the presence of wildlife. Disused resource roads can pose a danger to both drivers and passersby, due to the danger of landslides forming on unstable, poorly-drained ground.

Forest service road

A forest service road is a type of rudimentary access road, built by the United States Forest Service to access remote undeveloped areas. These roads are built mainly for the purposes of the logging industry and forest management workers, although in some cases they are also used for backcountry recreation access.

Networks of tributary roads branch off from a trunk FSR. Roads are usually named after a regional district, and branches have an alphanumeric designation.

Typically, a high-clearance four-wheel drive vehicle is required to travel effectively on a road, especially where large potholes and/or waterbars are present. Switchbacks are employed to make the road passable through steep terrain.

These roads rapidly fall into disrepair and quickly become impassable. Remnants of old roads can exist for decades. They are eventually erased by washout, erosion, and ecological succession.

Logging road

Logging roads are constructed to provide access to the forest for logging and other forest management operations. They are commonly narrow, winding, and unpaved, but main haul roads can be widened, straightened or paved if traffic volume warrants it.

The choice of road design standards is a tradeoff between construction costs and haul costs (which the road is designed to reduce). A road that serves only a few stands will be used by relatively few trucks over its lifetime and so it makes sense to save construction costs with a narrow, winding, unpaved road that adds to the time (and haul costs) of the few trips. A main haul road serving a large area, however, will be used by many trucks each day, and each trip will be shorter (saving time and money) if the road is straighter and wider, with a smoother surface.

Logging trucks are generally given right of way. In areas that the practice is regulated, on non-highway roads with heavy logging traffic may be "radio-controlled", meaning that a CB radio on board any vehicle on the road is advised for safety reasons.

Image gallery

Unpaved roads length by country

See also

References

External links

Environmentally Sensitive Maintenance Practices for Dirt and Gravel Roads U.S. Forest Service

Types of roads
Stone (material)